The peperone crusco ('crispy pepper',  peperoni cruschi) also known as 'crusco pepper', is a typical product of the Italian region of Basilicata.

It is recognized as a prodotto agroalimentare tradizionale  (traditional regional food product). Being deeply rooted in local cuisine, it is often characterized as "the red gold of Basilicata".

It is also fairly common in Calabria and limited uses can be found in Apulia, Abruzzo, and Molise.

Description 
It is a dried and sweet-flavoured type of capsicum annuum, cultivated in Basilicata since the 1600s. Usually the Senise pepper variety is used for its preparation, for the thin pulp and low water content which make it easier to be dried. It can assume three shapes: pointed, conical or hooked.

Cultivation 
Sowing begins in spring and harvest between July and August. Peppers are placed on cloths for three days in shady and dry places. Afterwards, they are tied with a lace forming garlands, called serte, and dried outdoors in the summer period. By tradition, they are hung on windows, balconies and houses' walls.

Culinary uses 
The peperoni cruschi are a staple of Lucanian cuisine. They can be consumed on their own as a vegetable chip, as a side dish, and as a flavour enhancer. Regularly they are cleaned with a dry cloth or kitchen paper, deprived of the petiole and the seeds and flash-fried for one or two seconds in hot olive oil, achieving a crispy texture after cooling down. Among traditional dishes with peperone crusco as a relevant ingredient are pasta con i peperoni cruschi, baccalà alla lucana, acquasale, and pane cotto.  It is also used as a powder flavour to enrich meat, legumes, bakery products, chocolate and ice cream.

See also
 Cuisine of Basilicata
 List of dried foods

References

Further reading
 

Cuisine of Basilicata
Capsicum cultivars
Peppers
Italian snack foods